Provincial road 34-12, named the O1-O2 connector is a  long motorway in Istanbul, Turkey. The motorway is a connector route linking the motorway O-1 (Istanbul Inner Beltway) to the motorway O-2 (Istanbul Outer Beltway), where it becomes the O-4 (Anatolian Motorway). The route is one of two motorways linking the two beltways on the Asian side of the city, the other being the Şile Motorway.

The O1-O2 connector was opened in 1991.

Route description

The O1-O2 connector begins at Anadolu Interchange in Üsküdar, where it diverges from the O-1. The two-lane motorway heads east right on the border of the Ataşehir/Üsküdar and later the Ataşehir/Ümraniye district line.

Transport in Istanbul Province
Provincial roads in Turkey
Üsküdar
Ataşehir